Below is a list of all the longest-running Australian television programs, both past and present, that have been broadcast for a minimum of 6–10 years or 6 seasons (or both).

All data is updated as of 2 February 2022.

Note:  Programs with a shaded background indicate the program is still in production.

40–69 years

30–39 years

25–29 years

20–24 years

15–19 years

10–14 years

6–9 years

See also

List of Australian television series
List of longest-running United States television series
List of longest-running Philippine television series
List of longest-running Indian television series
List of longest-running Spanish television series

References

External links

Lists of Australian television series
Television
Australian